Birgit (also known as Bergit, Birgid, Berguid) is an Afro-Asiatic language spoken in southeastern Chad. Speakers are found in Moubi Goz Canton, Kouka Margni Sub-prefecture and in Moubi Zarga Canton, Mangalmé Sub-prefecture.

Notes

References 

Jungraithmayr, Herrmann. 2004. Das Birgit eine osttschadische SpracheVokabular. In: Gábor Takács (ed.), Egyptian and Semito-Hamitic (Afro-Asiatic) studies: in memoriam W. Vycichl, 342–371. Leiden: Brill.

Jungraithmayr, Herrmann. 2005. Le paradigme verbal en -U dans les langues chamito-sémitiques. In: Antoine Lonnet and Amina Mettouchi (eds.), Les langues chamito-sémitiques (afro-asiatiques), vol. 1, 65–80. Paris: Ophrys.

Marti, Marianne, Calvain Mbernodji, and Katharina Wolf. 2007. L'enquete sociolinguistique des langues Birguit - Kadjakse - Masmedje du Tchad. SIL Electronic Survey Reports 2007-018. Dallas: SIL International. Online: https://sil.org/silesr/abstract.asp?ref=2007-018.

East Chadic languages
Languages of Chad